Streptomyces samsunensis is a bacterium species from the genus of Streptomyces which has been isolated from the rhizosphere from the tree Robinia pseudoacacia from the Ondokuz Mayıs University in Samsun in Turkey.

See also 
 List of Streptomyces species

References

Further reading

External links
Type strain of Streptomyces samsunensis at BacDive -  the Bacterial Diversity Metadatabase

samsunensis
Bacteria described in 2011